Gaynor McCown Expeditionary Learning School (often referred to as Gaynor McCown ELS, or simply McCown) is a public school located in the New Springville section of Staten Island, New York.

History
Gaynor McCown ELS was named after former NYC Outward Bound director Rosemary Gaynor McCown. The school was founded in 2007 and shares a campus with  CSIHSIS and Marsh Avenue Expeditionary Learning School 
Traci Frey was the Principal of the school from 2009 to 2019, she was later replaced by Maggie Bailey Tang

Sports
Gaynor McCown ELS shares PSAL sports team with CSIHSIS
PSAL Girls sports include Basketball, Cross Country, Fencing, Flag Football, Outdoor Track, Soccer, Softball, Tennis, Volleyball and Wrestling 

PSAL Boys sports include Baseball, Basketball, Cross Country, Fencing, Indoor Track, Soccer, Tennis, Wrestling

References

Public high schools in Staten Island
Educational institutions established in 2008
2008 establishments in New York City